Niesadna-Przecinka  is a village in the administrative district of Gmina Pilawa, within Garwolin County, Masovian Voivodeship, in east-central Poland.

The village has a population of 43.

References

Niesadna-Przecinka